Robot combat is a mode of robot competition in which custom-built machines fight using various methods to incapacitate each other. The machines have generally been remote-controlled vehicles rather than autonomous robots.

Robot combat competitions have been made into television series, including Robot Wars in the UK and Battlebots in the US. These shows were originally broadcast in the late 1990s to early 2000s and experienced revivals in the mid-2010s. As well as televised competitions, smaller robot combat events are staged for live audiences such as those organized by the Robot Fighting League.

Robot builders are generally hobbyists and the complexity and cost of their machines can vary substantially. Robot combat uses weight classes, with the heaviest robots able to exert more power and destructive capabilities. The rules of competitions are designed for the safety of the builders, operators, and spectators while also providing for an entertaining spectacle. Robot combat arenas are generally surrounded by a bulletproof screen.

Competitor robots come in a variety of designs, with different strategies for winning fights. Robot designs typically incorporate weapons for attacking opponents, such as axes, hammers, flippers, and spinning devices. Rules almost always prohibit gun-like weapons as well as other strategies not conducive to the safety and enjoyment of participants and spectators.

History

Among the oldest robotic combat competitions extant in the United States are the "Critter Crunch" (founded about 1987) in Denver and "Robot Battles" (founded in 1991) based in the southeastern U.S. Both events are run by members of the "Denver Mad Scientists Society".
1987 – The "Denver Mad Scientists Society" organized the first Critter Crunch competition at Denver's MileHiCon science-fiction convention.
1990 – The First Robot Olympics took place in Glasgow, Scotland organized by the Turing Institute and marking a 'peacetime' recreational contest between robots from multiple countries.
1991 – Kelly Lockhart organized the first "Robot Battles" competition at Atlanta's DragonCon science-fiction convention.
1994 – Marc Thorpe organized the first Robot Wars competition in San Francisco. Four annual competitions were held.
1997 – Rights to the Robot Wars name is transferred to British TV production company who produce the Robot Wars television series. Early seasons feature competitive games and obstacle courses as well as simple combat. The series aired 151 episodes across 12 series from 1997 to 2003. Special series were produced for the United States and the Netherlands.
1999 – Former Robot Wars competitors in the U.S. organize a new competition named BattleBots. The first tournament was shown as a webcast, with the second tournament shown as a cable 'Pay-per-view' event.
2000 – BattleBots is picked up as a weekly television program on Comedy Central. It would span five seasons ending in 2002.
2001 – Robotica appears on The Learning Channel as a weekly series. The format features tests of power, speed, and maneuverability as well as combat. The show ran in three series, ending in 2002.
2002 – Foundation of the Robot Fighting League, a regulatory body composed of the organizers of robot combat events in the United States, Canada, and Brazil. The body produces a unified set of regulations and promotes the sport.
2004 – Robot Combat is included as an event at the ROBOlympics in San Francisco, California, with competitors from multiple countries.
2008 – ROBOlympics changes its name to RoboGames and, while most events are not combat-related, Robot Combat is significantly featured.
2015 – BattleBots returns to television as a summer series on the ABC television network; it is renewed for a second season, which aired in the summer of 2016.
2016 – Robot Wars returns to British television on BBC2, with two further series in 2017.
2017 — Human-piloted robot fight Eagle Prime (produced by MegaBots) vs. Kuratas (produced by Suidobashi Heavy Industries)
2018 – BattleBots returns to television after a year hiatus on the Discovery Channel and The Science Channel. King of Bots, Fighting my Bot, This Is Fighting Robots and Clash Bots are held and broadcast in China. 
After the cancellation of Robot Wars by the BBC, Bugglebots, featuring past Robot Wars, Battlebots and King of Bots competitors in the beetleweight division is born and is broadcast on YouTube in December that year going on to have another season in 2019.

Rules 
Robot combat involves remotely controlled robots fighting in a purpose-built arena. A robot loses when it is immobilized, which may be due to damage inflicted from the other robot, being pushed into a position where it cannot drive (though indefinite holds or pins are typically not permitted), or being removed from the arena. Fights typically have a time limit, after which, if no robot is victorious, a judge or judges evaluates the performances to decide upon a winner.

Weight classes 

Similar to human combat sports, robot combat is conducted in weight classes though with maximum limits even in the heaviest class. Heavier robots are able to exert more power and have stronger armor and are generally more difficult and expensive to build.

Class definitions vary between competitions. The below table shows classifications for two organizations: the UK-based Fighting Robots Association (FRA) and the North American SPARC.

Most televised events are of heavyweights. Its worth noting that the definitions of each weight category have changed over time - with European (FRA) rules for heavyweights advancing from 80kg, to 100kg, to 110kg over time. To encourage diversity of design, rules often give an extra weight allotment for robots that can walk rather than roll on wheels.

Safety precautions

Given the violent nature of robot fighting, safety is a central factor in the design of the venue, which is generally a sturdy arena, usually constructed of steel, wood, and bullet resistant clear polycarbonate plastic. The smaller, lighter classes compete in smaller arenas than the heavyweights.

Competition rules set limits on construction features that are too dangerous or which could lead to uninteresting contests. Strict limits are placed on materials and pressures used in pneumatic or hydraulic actuators, and fail-safe systems are required for electronic control circuits. Generally off-limits for use as weapons are nets, liquids, deliberate radio jamming, high-voltage electric discharge, untethered projectiles, and usually fire.

Robot fighting associations 
The sport has no overall governing body, though some regional associations oversee several events in managerial or advisory capacities with published rulesets. These include:
Robot Fighting League (RFL), primarily U.S., operated 2002—2012
Fighting Robot Association (FRA), U.K and Europe, 2003–present
Standardised Procedures for the Advancement of Robot Combat (SPARC), U.S., 2015–present

The major televised competitions have operated outside of these associations.

Combat robot weaponry and design 

An effective combat robot must have some method of damaging or controlling the actions of its opponent while at the same time protecting itself from aggression. The tactics employed by combat robot operators and the robot designs which support those tactics are numerous. Although some robots have multiple weapons, the more successful competitors concentrate on a single form of attack. This is a list of most of the basic types of weapons. Most robot weaponry falls into one of the following categories:

Rammer – Robots employing high-power drive trains and heavy armor are able to use their speed and maneuverability to crash into their opponent repeatedly with the hope of damaging weapons and vital components. Their pushing power may also be used to shove their opponent into arena hazards. Rammers (AKA 'Bricks') typically have four or six wheels for traction and stability and are often designed to be fully operational when inverted. Because modern rulesets require all robots to have a moving weapon, modern rammers are equipped with other weapon types. Robot Wars Series 6 champion Tornado and Series 7 runner-up Storm II were effective rammers.
Wedge – Similar in concept to a rammer, the wedge uses a low-clearance inclined wedge or scoop to move in under an opponent and break its contact with the arena floor – decreasing its mobility and rendering it easy to push off into a wall or hazard. The wedge is also useful in deflecting attacks by other robots. Small wedge-lets are used to lift an opposing bot and feed it to a secondary weapon system.  A small wedge may be attached to the rear of a robot with other weaponry for use as a 'backup' in case the main weapon fails. Like rammers, modern wedges must be combined with some other weapon in order to be legal. The lower the degree of inclination of the wedge, the higher the chances of lifting the opponent bot from the ground. The 1995 US Robot Wars middleweight champion La Machine was an early and effective wedge design as was Robot Wars Series 1 champion, Roadblock (1997), and the deceptively simple 2018 BattleBots competitor DUCK!
Saw Blades – A popular weapon in the early years of robotic combat, these robots use a dedicated motor to power either a modified chainsaw or circular saw, or a custom-built cutting disc, usually at high speeds (up to 10,000 rpm). The serrated blade is used to slice through an opponent's armor to try and reach its internal components. These weapons can create spectacular showers of sparks, and are easy to combine with other designs, but can be ineffective against robots with tougher armor. The aforementioned Robot Wars champion Roadblock had a rear-mounted circular saw in addition to its wedge, while Series 4 runner-up Pussycat had a custom cutting disc with four serrated blades.

Vertical Disc/Bar - A vertical disc or bar spinner consists of a circular disc or flat bar mounted on the horizontal axis. It spins considerably slower and is larger and thicker than most saw blades. The disc has teeth attached to it to catch opponents and either throw them into the air or rip chunks out of opponents. Bars can have added teeth, but generally do not in the smaller weight classes where they are used most. Discs and bars generally have much larger impacts compared to saw blades. The main advantage of a disc or bar is its ability to throw opponents into the air as well as break off pieces of its opponents.  Notable vertical disc spinners include Robot Wars competitor Aftershock (shown on right) and 2020 Battlebots winner Endgame. Notable bar spinners include Deep Six, a relatively unsuccessful Battlebots competitor known for its massive damage output and lack of control.
Drum Spinner - Drum spinners consist of a thick, short cylinder with teeth spinning on a horizontal axis. Drum spinners spin with a higher speed than vertical discs or bars, but have less reach. Good drum spinners can land a solid hit almost every time they contact another robot and send it flying as high as a normal vertical disc or bar. Drums are also much thicker, meaning almost the entire front of the robot is taken up by a weapon. Drum spinners have a tendency to suffer from extreme drive issues due to the large amounts of gyroscopic forces. Notable drum spinners include the Battlebots competitor Minotaur and 3 pound robot Lynx, which dominates the 3 pound class to such an extent that it is being retired to give other teams a chance to win.
Overhead spinner/Midcutter/Undercutter - Overhead spinners, midcutters, and undercutters are all the same concept and are all horizontal spinners with varying weapon locations. In a overhead spinner, the spinner (usually a bar) is directly overtop the robot, similarly to a full body spinner. Midcutters have a spinner placed about halfway up the robot (usually slightly lower). Undercutters have a spinner low enough almost to scrape the ground. All of these types can use a disc or bar, although bars are usually more effective. Weapons usually spin at a similar speed to verical bars/discs)  Advantages of this type of weapon are the large impacts and tendency to throw other robots across the arena floor. Notable robots of this variety are Battlebots competitor Tombstone, which was known to tear all robots, regardless of armor, into pieces and proceed to throw the mangled remains throughout the area. Bloodsport (also a Battlebots competitor) is another notable robot, along with Vector ( a U.S. beetleweight). Notable British robots of this type are Carbide, the British equivalent of Tombstone.
Full Body Spinner – Taking the concept of the spinner to the extreme, a full-body spinner (AKA shell spinner or tuna can spinner) rotates the entire outer shell of the robot as a stored energy weapon. Other robot components (batteries, weapon motor casing) may be attached to the shell to increase the spinning mass while keeping the mass of the drive train to a minimum. Full body spinners require time to spin the weapon up to speed, typically cannot self-right, and can be unstable — the original (2000–2005) BattleBots competitor Mauler being an infamous example (though its stability issues were eventually resolved by 2002), with the slightly more recent debutants Shrederator (2003-2006, 2014-present) and Megabyte (2002-2009, 2017-present), having a great deal of success in the live circuit, the former eventually making its televised debut in BattleBots under the name Captain Shrederator (which competed in all three ABC/Discovery/Science Channel 2010s seasons), and the latter making its televised debut in King of Bots. As of 2018, “Gigabyte”, a more powerful version of its predecessor “Megabyte”, competed in Battlebots with a directional pole also used for self-righting purposes, and achieved decent success, reaching the Round of 16 in Season 10 of the show, and defeating former Battlebots champ “Son of Whyachi” in the “Bounty Hunters” tournament. The 1995 US Robot Wars heavyweight co-champion Blendo was the first effective full-body spinner. A variant, the ring spinner, features a narrower spinning ring surrounding the robot; these designs have the advantage of being invertible. BattleBots 2016 competitor The Ringmaster is an example of a ring-spinner.
Melty-Brain Spinner – A variation of the full-body spinner, where a robot's electronics allow it to drive in such a way that the entire robot rotates while it can move towards an opponent. This kind of design tends to be incorporated into invertible builds and requires a spin-up time like other spinners. One of the earliest known examples of this kind of robot is BattleBots lightweight quarter-finalist Herr Gepoünden, which managed to compete all the way till 2017, where by that point, very few thwackbots competed in its weight class. However, the first and best known Heavyweight Melty-Brain Spinner is Nuts 2, which had chains connected to two "flail" weapons on either side of the machine. This wasn't very effective for damaging armor but was extremely good at damaging exposed critical parts of opponents' machines. Nuts 2 ultimately finished joint 3rd (with Behemoth) in Series 10 of UK Robot Wars, ending the dominant run of Series 8 finalist and Series 9 Champion Carbide along the way, by breaking the robot's weapon chain, rendering it defenseless.
Thwackbot – A narrow, high-speed, two-wheel drive train attached to a long boom with an impact weapon on the end creates a robot that can spin in place at a high speed, swinging the weapon in a horizontal circle. The simplicity and durability of the design are appealing, but the robot cannot be made to move in a controlled manner while spinning without employing sophisticated electronics (See Melty-Brain Spinner above). The 1995 US Robot Wars lightweight champion Test Toaster 1 was a thwackbot, as were T-Wrex and Golddigger from the BattleBots series.
Torque Reaction – A variant on the thwackbot is the torque reaction hammer, also known as axlebots. These robots have two very large wheels with the small body of the robot hanging in between them. A long weapon boom has a vertically oriented hammer, pick, or axe on the end. On acceleration, the weapon boom swings upward and over to the rear of the robot to offset the motor torque. When the robot reverses direction, the weapon will swing forcibly back over the top and hopefully impact the opponent. These robots are simple and can put on a flashy, aggressive show, but their attack power is relatively small and, like thwackbots, they can be hard to control. BattleBots 2.0 middleweight champion Spaz was a torque reaction pickaxe robot, whilst Robot Wars Grand Finalist Stinger opted for a disc, later replaced with a bludgeoning mace.
Lifter – Using tactics similar to a wedge, the lifter uses a powered arm, prow, or platform to get underneath the opponent and lift it away from the arena surface to remove its maneuverability. The lifter may then push the other robot toward arena hazards or attempt to toss the opponent onto its back. The lifter is typically powered by either an electric or pneumatic actuator. Two-time US Robot Wars and four-time BattleBots heavyweight champion Biohazard was an electric lifter.

Flipper – Although mechanically resembling a lifter, the flipper uses much higher levels of pneumatic power to fire the lifting arm or panel explosively upward. An effective flipper can throw opponents end-over-end through the air causing damage from the landing impact or, in Robot Wars, toss it completely out of the arena. Flippers use a large volume of compressed gas and often have a limited number of effective attacks before their supply runs low. The two-time Robot Wars champion Chaos 2 and original, 2000s-era BattleBots superheavyweight champion Toro and middleweight competitor T-Minus were flippers, as is the same Team Inertia's more recent heavyweight robot Bronco, with both T-Minus and Bronco capable of self-righting with their powerful pneumatic flippers. Hydraulic flippers, while not "common" in robot combat, have managed to start achieving some degree of success, as with Team Whyachi's flipper Hydra, which gave Bronco a serious challenge in the 2019 BattleBots competition. Other solutions include e.g. utilizing internal flywheels, as shown by the success of Team Seems Reasonable's flipper Blip in the 2021 BattleBots competition. While most flippers operate with the pneumatic arm hinged at the machine's rear, Robot Wars' Firestorm achieved remarkable success with a front-hinged flipper, placing third in Robot Wars on three separate occasions (Series 3, 5, and 6) never failing to advance to the series' semifinal rounds, flipping a total of 7 out of the arena (the only heavyweight robot to flip another out of the arena with a front-hinged flipper) and having the most UK championship competition fight wins, of 23, as well as winning the second-most fights out of any competitor/series of competitors on UK Robot Wars, with only Razer having more wins overall.
Stabber – Mechanically similar to the flipper is the stabber, which throws or stabs opponents forward instead of upward. An effective stabber can penetrate into the opponent, damage vital inner parts. When they fail to penetrate, they throw their opponent back across the arena into walls or hazards. Stabbers typically use a large volume of compressed gas, which limits the number of times they can fire their weapon in a fight. BattleBots super heavyweight Rammstein was a stabber.
Clamper – Another lifter variant, the clamper adds an arm or claw that descends from above to secure the opposing robot in place on a lifting platform. The entire assembly then lifts and carries the opponent wherever the operator pleases. Two-time BattleBots super heavyweight champion Diesector was an electric clamper, as well as middleweight runner-up Complete Control.
Dustpan – An uncommon variant on the clamper, the dustpan simplifies the design by replacing the lifting platform with a wide box open at the front and top. An opponent maneuvered into the box may then be restrained with an arm or claw from above. Some designs use only the box with no restraining claw. BattleBots middleweight runner-up S.O.B. used a dustpan in conjunction with a saw blade mounted on an arm, with the more recent 2018 BattleBots competitor SawBlaze using a 180º pivoted-arm-mounted circular saw on their trident-style dustpan design to cut downwards into an opponent. 
Crusher – Like flywheels, crushers can be separated into horizontal and vertical variants. Vertical crushers use a hydraulic cylinder attached to a sharp piercing arm to pin and slowly penetrate the top armor of the opponent. Robot Wars Series 5 Champion and two-time world champion Razer was the first vertical crusher, and by far the most successful. Horizontal crushers feature two of these arms, which act like pincers to crush robots between them. Two-time Robot Wars Annihilator champion Kan-Opener armed with horizontal claws, and King of Bots Champion "Spectre" armed with a vertical 'biting fang' - or like the Dutch-fielded, hydraulically-powered ten tonne-force "toucan-billed" robot Petunia in recent seasons of Discovery Channel's Battlebots are other examples of successful crushers.
Overhead Axe – Swinging a high-speed axe, spike, or hammer forcefully down onto your opponent offers another method of attacking the vulnerable top surface. The weapon is typically driven by a pneumatic actuator via a rack and pinion or direct mechanical linkage. The attack may damage the opposing robot directly, or may lodge in their robot and provide a handle for dragging them toward a hazard. BattleBots heavyweight runner-up and Robot Wars competitor Killerhurtz was armed with an overhead axe. Some axes are double-sided, and can strike opponents both in front of and behind the robot; Killerhurtz' successor Terrorhurtz, and Robot Wars Series 2 Grand Finalist Killertron, were examples of this. The heavyweight pneumatically powered, bifurcated-armed pickaxe of Chomp from the 2016 and 2018 Battlebots competitions also incorporated short metal "wing" levers at the pickaxe-arms' rear ends to upright its bulky chassis if knocked onto its side during combat, and pioneered a hardware design that autonomously turned Chomp to always face its opponent during a match. 
SRiMech – Many robots are incapable of running inverted, due to their shape, weaponry, or both. A SRiMech (self-righting mechanism) is an Active Design element that returns an inverted robot to mobility in the upright state. The SRiMech is typically an electric or pneumatic arm or extension on the upper surface of the robot which pushes against the arena floor to roll or flip the robot upright. Most flippers, some lifters, and even some carefully designed axes can double as SRiMechs. Even a vertical spinning weapon may be used as a crude self-righting device. Team Nightmare's lightweight vertical spinner Backlash was designed such that when flipped it would hit the ground with the spinning disc and kick back upright. The first successful unaided use of an SRiMech in competition was at the 1997 U.S. Robot Wars when the immobilized Vlad the Impaler used a dedicated pneumatic device to pop back upright in a match against Biohazard.

Many modern rulesets, such as the rebooted versions of BattleBots and Robot Wars, require robots to have an active weapon in order to improve the visual spectacle, thus eliminating certain designs such as torque-reaction axlebots and thwackbots, and requiring other designs such as wedges and rammers to incorporate some other kind of weapon.

Interchangeable weaponry
It is increasingly common for robots to have interchangeable weaponry or other modular components, allowing them to adapt to a wide range of opponents and increasing their versatility; such robots are often referred to as "Swiss army bots", in reference to Swiss army knives. Arguably the earliest example was Robot Wars Series 1 contestant Plunderbird, which could change between a pneumatic spike and a circular saw on an extendable arm. Successful Swiss army bots include Robot Wars Series 6 champion Tornado, BattleBots 2016 runner-up Bombshell, and top-ranked US Beetleweight Silent Spring.

Sometimes, robots that were not originally Swiss army bots have had their weapons changed or altered on the fly, typically due to malfunctions. In BattleBots 2015, Ghost Raptors spinning bar weapon broke in its first fight; builder Chuck Pitzer then improvised new weapons for each following fight, including a "De-Icer" arm attachment which it used to unbalance and defeat bar spinner Icewave in the quarter-finals.

 Prohibited weaponry 
Since the first robot combat competitions, some types of weapons have been prohibited either because they violated the spirit of the competition or they could not be safely used. Prohibited weapons have generally included:

Radio jamming
High voltage electric discharge
Liquids (glue, oil, water, corrosives...)
Fire (except in BattleBots and Norwalk Havoc)
Explosives
Un-tethered projectiles (except in BattleBots from 2018 season onwards)
Entanglement devices (except in Robot Wars from series 10 onwards)
Lasers above 1 milliwatt
Visual obstruction
Halon – a specific fire extinguishing gas effective as a weapon in stopping internal combustion engines. Note that current rules do not specifically ban Halon as it is no longer commercially available.

Individual competitions have made exceptions to the above list. Notably, the Robotica competitions allowed flame weapons and the release of limited quantities of liquids on a case-by-case basis. The modern series of BattleBots also permits the use of flamethrowers and, as of 2016, untethered projectiles, provided that the latter are merely for show. Competitions may also restrict or ban certain otherwise legal weapons, such as banning spinners and other high-power weapons at events where the arena is not able to contain these weapons. A well-known example of this is the Sportsman ruleset.

Arena hazards have also been granted exceptions to the list of prohibited weapons. Robot Wars in particular used flame devices both in the stationary hazards and on one of the roaming "House Robots".

 Unusual weaponry 

A very wide variety of unusual weapons and special design approaches have been tried with varying success and several types of weapons would have been tried had they not been prohibited.Entanglement weapons – Several early US Robot Wars competitors sought to immobilize their opponents with entangling weapons. Nets and streamers of adhesive tape were both tried with mixed success. Entangling weapons were prohibited in Robot Wars and BattleBots from 1997 onward, but the Robotica competitions allowed nets, magnets, and other entangling devices on a case-by-case basis, and Robot Wars allowed limited use of entanglement devices in Series 10.Flame weapons – Although prohibited for use by competitors in Robot Wars and the first edition (2000–05) of BattleBots, the rules for Robotica, the Robot Fighting League and the post-2015 version of BattleBots do allow flame weapons under some circumstances. RFL super heavyweight competitor Alcoholic Stepfather (unique for using mecanum wheels for movement around an arena) and Robotica competitor Solar Flare, as well as the later BattleBots series competitors Free Shipping and overhead pneumatic-pickaxe armed Chomp employing gaseous flamethrower weapons. Gruff is a BattleBots competitor that competed with its main weapon solely as a high power flamethrower (two as of season 5) with the help of a lifter, with moderate success. Flamethrowers are seldom effective weapons, mainly due to their effectiveness being limited for safety reasons, but are audience favorites.Smothering weapons – The BattleBots and Robot Wars lightweight competitor Tentoumushi used a large plastic sandbox cover shaped like a ladybug ("tentoumushi" being Japanese for ladybug) on a powered arm to drop down over opposing robots, covering and encircling them. Once covered, it was difficult to tell what the opponent was doing and who was dragging whom around the arena. One version of the robot had a circular saw concealed under the cover to inflict physical damage, another had a small grappling hook.Tethered projectiles – Although tethered projectiles are specifically allowed and discussed in major rules sets, their use is quite rare. Neptune fought at BattleBots 3.0 with pneumatic spears on tethers, but was unable to damage its opponent. During a friendly weapons test, Team Juggerbot allowed the builders of Neptune to take a couple shots against their bot. One of two shots penetrated an aluminum panel below the main armor, while the other bounced off the top armor.Multibots (clusterbots) – A single robot that breaks apart into multiple, independently controlled robots has appealed to a few competitors. The Robot Wars heavyweight Gemini and the BattleBots middleweight Pack Raptors were two-part multibots that had some success. The rules concerning clusterbots have varied over the years, either stating that 50% of the clusterbot has to be immobilised to eliminate the robot from the tournament (in the Dutch version of Robot Wars, there was a 3-part multibot named , and although one of its parts was tossed out of the arena by Matilda, the robot as a whole was still deemed mobile, and the other 2 parts of  did enough to win the match), or that all of a multibot's segments have to be incapacitated before a knock-out victory can be declared. Current Robot Fighting League match rules require the latter to be achieved.Minibots (nuisancebots) – Similar to the concept of multibots, minibots are small robots, typically no larger than a featherweight, that fight alongside a larger main robot with the aim of harassing or distracting opponents. They are often sacrificial in nature and have minimal weaponry. BattleBots 2015 competitor Witch Doctor was accompanied by a featherweight minibot named Shaman that was equipped with a flamethrower, and which gained significant popularity for its spirited performances during battles. Other Battlebots competitors also successfully used minibots such as Son of Whyachi in 2016, and 2018 fan favorite WAR Hawk and their beetleweight minibot WAR Stop, which was equipped with a wedge.Halon gas – Rhino fought at the 1997 U.S. Robot Wars event with a halon gas fire extinguisher, which was very effective at stopping internal combustion engines. Gas weapons of this nature were promptly prohibited from future competitions.Pneumatic Cannon  – First implemented by season eight Battlebots competitor Double Jeopardy, the robot fired off a 5-pound "slug" at 190 mph, exerting 4,500 pounds of force upon impact. This robot, however, did not perform well during its competition, as it only had one shot at landing a good hit: from there, it would have to rely on pushing its opponents, at which it failed. It subsequently upgraded its cannon to be more powerful and added the ability to fire more than one shot, though to this day, it has only one win under its belt.

 Unusual propulsion 
The great majority of combat robots roll on wheels, which are very effective on the smooth surfaces used for typical robot combat competition. Other propulsion strategies do pop-up with some frequency.Tank treads – Numerous combat robots have used treads or belts in place of wheels in an attempt to gain additional traction. Treads are generally heavier and more vulnerable to damage than a wheeled system and offer no particular traction advantage on the types of surfaces common in robot combat. Most uses of treads are for their striking appearance. The Robot Wars competitors Track-tion, 101 and Mortis along with the BattleBots super heavyweight Ronin used treads. Biteforce, the winner of the 2015 Battlebots Competitions, originally used magnets embedded in its treads in an attempt to gain extra downforce without extra weight.Walking – The spectacle of a multi-legged robot walking across the arena into combat is a big audience favorite. Robot combat rules typically have given walking robots an additional weight allowance to offset their slower speed, the complexity of the mechanism, and to encourage their construction. What the event organizers had in mind was something like the spider-legged robot Mechadon, but what most often was produced were simple rule-shaving propulsion systems that attempted to save as much of the extra weight allowance as possible for additional weaponry. Attempts at more restrictive definitions of "Walking" have effectively eliminated walking robots from competition. BattleBots heavyweight champion Son of Whyachi used a controversial cam-driven "Shufflebot" propulsion system, which was promptly declared ineligible for additional weight allowance at subsequent competitions.Gyroscopic precession – Used in the Antweight robot Gyrobot, as well as the Battlebots competitor Wrecks, this system uses a gyroscope and stationary feet that lift as the entire robot rotates due to gyroscopic precession when the gyroscope is tilted by a servo motor. This design can use the gyroscope as a spinning weapon (horizontal or vertical) which allows for efficient double-usage of the gyroscope mass. Although Gyrobot and Wrecks appear to be walking as it translates across the arena, they're not classified as walking robots under current rules. This unusual drive train produces strange and often unpredictable movements, though has shown to be successful in combat.Suction fan – Several competitors experimented with the use of fans to evacuate air from a low-clearance shell to suck the robot down onto the arena surface and add traction. Robotica competitor Armorgeddon used a suction fan to increase traction and pushing power, and Robot Wars and Battlebots competitor Killerhurtz experimented with use of a suction fan to counter the forces from its hammer/axe weapon, a system that was demonstrated as giving the robot the ability to climb walls but was never utilised in combat.
Similar designs have appeared in robot-sumo competitions where traction is a key factor.Magnetic Wheels – Another approach to gaining traction and stability involves the use of rare-earth magnets, either ring-shaped as wheels or simply attached to the robot's base. This is, naturally, only effective in arenas which have magnetic metal surfaces. Due to the expense of large ring magnets, this trick has been used almost exclusively in three-pound and under "insect class" robots, although a lightweight battlebot General Gau tried implementing them. A multibot named Hammer and Anvil would later use magnets in the lightweight category, with some success. Heavyweight Robotica competitor Hot Wheels attempted to use a large chassis-mounted magnet to gain traction and apparent weight, and Beta unsuccessfully attempted to use an electromagnet to counter the reaction forces of its massive hammer weapon at the BattleBots competition. This however was removed for future competitions as the power of the magnets rendered the robot unable to move.Mecanum wheels – Together with a specialized motor control system, mecanum wheels allow controlled motion in any direction without turning, as demonstrated by Alcoholic Stepfather in a 2004 match, and by the hammer-wielding Battlebots competitor Shatter! in 2019.Translational drift – Also known as Melty Brain or Tornado Drive, this sophisticated system supplements the thwackbot drivetrain with electronic rotation sensors and rapid speed controller switching that allows a rotating thwackbot to move in a controlled manner while spinning. Several robots have implemented this complex design, but few with particular success.  Herr Gepoünden, a lightweight robot, has shown successful use of the Tornado Drive and has used it successfully in smaller competitions. Additionally, Nuts 2 utilized this technology with tremendous effect on Robot Wars and managed to finish third overall in Series 10 in 2017. The drive is usually implemented with an LED light system that indicates to the driver the direction the robot will move when commanded to move forwards.Flying – The 1995 US Robot Wars event had a flying competitor: S.P.S. #2 was a lighter-than-air craft buoyed by three weather balloons and propelled by small electric fans. It attempted to drop a net on the opponent. Nearly invulnerable to attack, it won the first match against Orb of Doom (see reference below), but ventured too close to the arena floor in the second match and was dragged down and "popped". Starting in 2016, BattleBots permitted the use of drones as "nuisance bots"; these typically proved hard to control, and one was memorably swatted out of the air by a rake that competitor HyperShock had attached to its lifting forks.Rolling sphere – The aforementioned Orb of Doom was a featherweight competitor at the 1995 US Robot Wars. It consisted of a lightweight, rigid shell made of carbon fiber-kevlar cloth and polyester resin, applied over a foam core pattern. Inside was an offset-weight mechanism made from a battery-powered electric drill. A similar looking robot named Psychosprout appeared in the UK Robot Wars.Rolling tube –Snake competed at Battlebots and the US Robot Wars using a series of actuators to bend its triangular cross-section tubular body to roll, writhe, and slither across the arena.Shuffling – refers to the movement of robots that are propelled by a cam-driven system. See WalkingBrush Drive – Similar to Gyroscopic precession, brush drive uses brushes affixed to the bottom of the robot. These work in tandem with a pair of vertical spinning weapons to make the robot slide across the arena.Magnets and Rapid Deceleration – While it has never been done, an entrant to Battlebots' seventh season, titled Bad Penny, had planned on using a magnetic system combined with a braking system to move their robot around the arena. Six magnets would pull down on the floor with over 2000 pounds (~909 kilograms) of force. To move, the robot would rely on rapidly braking its spinning ring, which was around the entire robot, while simultaneously turning off five of the six magnets. This, in turn, would force the robot to pivot around the one magnet still on.Hopping''' – Using pneumatic legs or spikes, robots such as the featherweight Spazhammer were capable of moving around the arena by repeatedly stabbing the floor.

 Robot-sumo

Robot-sumo is a related sport where robots try to shove each other out of a ring rather than destroy or disable each other. Unlike remote-controlled combat robots, machines in these competitions are often automated.

 See also 
 CTF 2187Robot WarsBattleBotsRobotica (TV series)RoboGamesRoboMaster"I, (Annoyed Grunt)-bot" – episode of The Simpsons featuring robot combat.
Model Warship Combat – robotic model warship engage in model combat using pneumatic cannonsRobot Arena 2 – Notable robot combat video game
Roborace
Soccer robot
Robot-sumo

References

 External links 

 Full results of major robotic competitions, including Robot Wars, Battlebots, and Robotica''

North America
Robot Combat League (TV Show) 
Robot Fighting League – North and South American rules and oversight organization
Robot Battles
SPARC – Standardized Practices for the Advancement of Robotic Combat, current North American rules organization
South America
Brazilian Robot Combat League
Europe
Fighting Robot Association – FRA
 http://www.dutchrobotgames.nl – Dutchrobotgames Dutch Roboteers Association
 http://www.roboteers.org – German Roboteers Association
Australia
Robowars Australia - National forum and Victorian organisation

 
Uncrewed vehicles
Robotics competitions
Science education